Elías Gómez may refer to:

 Elías Gómez (footballer, born 1986), Argentine goalkeeper
 Elías Gómez (footballer, born 1994), Argentine defender